Sisco is a ghost town located in Putnam County, Florida, United States.  It lies off U.S. Route 17 approximately 10 miles north of Crescent City.

In 1884, Sisco was settled by Henry W. and Claire Sisco along the Jacksonville, Tampa and Key West Railway.  For the next forty years or so, the population of the town ranged from 150 people to 60 people and, at times, had a post office, hotel, general store and a steam sawmill.

During the 1920s, there was a steamboat stop along Dunn's Creek that provided wood and water to the ships loaded with citrus and it was used also as a post office for the towns of Pomona and Cisco.

Today, the site of the former town is part of Dunns Creek State Park.

See also
List of ghost towns in Florida

Notes

External links
1890 Map of Putnam County
Sisco, Florida at Ghosttowns.com
Obituary of W. W. Sisco at Genealogytrails.com

Ghost towns in Florida
Former populated places in Putnam County, Florida